The 1948–49 Czechoslovak Extraliga season was the sixth season of the Czechoslovak Extraliga, the top level of ice hockey in Czechoslovakia. Eight teams participated in the league, and LTC Prag won the championship.

Regular season

1. Liga-Qualification

External links
History of Czechoslovak ice hockey

Czechoslovak Extraliga seasons
Czech
1948 in Czechoslovak sport
1949 in Czechoslovak sport